Alexia Marie Bryn (also credited as Schøien and Bryn-Schøien; 24 March 1889 – 19 July 1983) was a Norwegian pair skater. She competed with Yngvar Bryn. They won silver medals at the 1920 Summer Olympics and at the 1923 World Figure Skating Championships, as well as the bronze at the 1912 Worlds.

Results
Pairs with (Yngvar Bryn)

References

Sources

External links
 
 
 

Norwegian female pair skaters
1889 births
1983 deaths
Figure skaters at the 1920 Summer Olympics
Olympic figure skaters of Norway
Olympic silver medalists for Norway
Olympic medalists in figure skating
World Figure Skating Championships medalists
Medalists at the 1920 Summer Olympics
Sportspeople from Oslo
20th-century Norwegian women